The Embassy of the United Kingdom in Warsaw is the chief diplomatic mission of the United Kingdom in Poland. It is located on Kawalerii street in the Ujazdów district. The current British Ambassador to Poland is Anna Clunes.

History

The current embassy building on Kawalerii Street was built between 2008 and 2009, designed by Tony Fretton and cost £27m to construct. It is located next door to the Spanish and Dutch Embassies.

During the interbellum period (1918-1939), the embassy was located in the Branicki Palace. From 1945 until 2008, the embassy was located in the Wielopolski Palace at Ujazdów Avenue 15. The embassy building was designed by Jozef Huss and built c. 1875 as the home for Polish aristocrats. The building escaped relatively undamaged by World War II and therefore was acquired by the British government in 1945 to house the British Embassy; previously it had been used as the Estonian Embassy.

Gallery

See also
Poland–United Kingdom relations
List of diplomatic missions in Poland
List of Ambassadors of the United Kingdom to Poland

References

Warsaw
United Kingdom
Buildings and structures in Warsaw
Poland–United Kingdom relations